Planitrochidae is an extinct family of fossil sea snails, Paleozoic gastropod mollusks.

This family has no subfamilies.

Genera
Genera within the family Planotrochidae include:
 Horologium
 Nematrochus
 Perneritrochus
 Planotrochus, the type genus
 Trochomphalus''

References 

 Paleobiology database info

Prehistoric gastropods